Mahmud Raqi District is located in the western part of Kapisa Province, Afghanistan. It borders with Parvan Province to the south and with other districts from Kapisa Province: Nijrab District and the former Kohistan District to the north and Tagab District to the southeast. The district center is the town of Mahmud Raqi - the provincial capital. The population is  56,800 (2006).

External links

AIMS District Map

Districts of Kapisa Province